Alles-sur-Dordogne (literally Alles on Dordogne) is a commune in the Dordogne department in Nouvelle-Aquitaine in southwestern France.  It is situated on the river Dordogne.

Population

History
In 1933, the commune of Alles was renamed Alles-sur-Dordogne.

See also
Communes of the Dordogne département

References

Communes of Dordogne